11E, 11e or eleven E may refer to:
11th meridian east
GCR Class 11E, a class of British 4-4-0 steam locomotive
Kepler-11e, an exoplanet orbiting the star Kepler-11
South African Class 11E, a class of Co-Co electric locomotive
Tropical Depression Eleven-E (2010), a weather system which developed into Tropical Storm Hermine
U.S. Route 11E, a highway connecting Knoxville, Tennessee with Bristol, Virginia
11 East Forsyth or 11 E, a historic building in Jacksonville, Florida

See also
E11 (disambiguation)